Büyükköy can refer to:

 Büyükköy, Çayeli, a town in Rize Province
 Büyükköy, İliç
 Büyükköy, Korkuteli
 Büyükköy, Üzümlü